Hilton Kgosimang Moreeng (born 1 February 1978) is a former South African cricketer who is the current head coach of the South African women's national team.

Moreeng was born in Kimberley, but played all his domestic cricket for Free State. A wicket-keeper and right-handed batsman, his first-class debut came against Northerns in October 2001, during the 2001–02 season of the SuperSport Series. Moreeng remained in the side for another three matches after his debut, but struggled with his batting, scoring only 14 runs from four innings. He was eventually replaced as wicket-keeper by Morne van Wyk for the remainder of the season, and did not make any further appearances for Free State until almost six years later. Moreeng was recalled to the team for a final stint during the 2007–08 season, making a total of five appearances in the CSA Provincial Competitions – two in the three-day format and three in the one-day format.

After retiring from playing, Moreeng took up coaching, gaining a Level III certification from Cricket South Africa. In December 2012, he was appointed coach of the South African women's national side, replacing Yashin Ebrahim-Hassen. He has since coached the team at two major tournaments, the 2013 World Cup and the 2014 World Twenty20, as well as in the team's matches in the ICC Women's Championship.

References

External links
Player profile and statistics at Cricket Archive
Player profile and statistics at ESPNcricinfo

1978 births
Living people
Free State cricketers
Cricketers from Kimberley, Northern Cape
South African cricket coaches
South African cricketers
Wicket-keepers